Invermay is a residential locality in the local government area (LGA) of Launceston in the Launceston LGA region of Tasmania. The 2021 census recorded a population of 3,498 for the state suburb of Invermay.
It is a suburb of Launceston, which contains the minor suburb of Inveresk, it is located on the eastern side of the Tamar River and the northern side of the North Esk River, the suburb is most notable as being home to York Park (University of Tasmania Stadium).

Invermay is also home to many of Launceston's cultural institutions, in an area known as the "Inveresk Precinct" including the Tramway museum, Queen Victoria Museum and Art Gallery, The Powerhouse Gallery and ArtSpace and University of Tasmania campus. Invermay is home to Riverbend Park which was voted Tasmania’s Favourite Playground in 2021.

History 
Invermay was gazetted as a locality in 1863. It was proclaimed a Town in 1896 and included in Greater Launceston in 1907.

Geography
The waters of the Tamar River and the North Esk River form the north-western to south-eastern boundaries.

Road infrastructure 
Route A8 (East Tamar Highway) runs through from south to north.

References

Suburbs of Launceston, Tasmania
Localities of City of Launceston